Cédric Ebewa-Yam Mimbala (born 22 August 1986) is a Congolese professional footballer who played as a defender. He also holds German citizenship.

Club career 
Born in Bonn, Mimbala began playing football with 1. FC Köln's youth academy. In 1999, he moved to Bonner SC, where he stayed one season. In 2000, the joined the club's city rival MSV Bonn. After two years, he signed a youth contract with PSI Yurdumspor Köln. Mimbala played six months for PSI Yurdumspor Köln, before transferring to Alemannia Aachen in January 2004.

He played two years in the Under 19 Bundesliga for Alemannia Aachen. In January 2006, he signed his first professional contract for K.F.C. Dessel Sport in the Belgian Second Division. After only six months in Belgium, he returned to Germany to sign for SpVgg Bayern Hof. For Hof, he played 19 games and scored one goal in the Oberliga Bayern. In July 2007, he signed for Fortuna Köln.

On 23 April 2009, he announced his transfer to FC Schalke 04 II. On 21 May 2010, he left the reserve team of FC Schalke 04 and signed with 3. Liga club Rot Weiss Ahlen.

International career 
Mimbala earned four caps for the DR Congo national team.

Position 
Mimbala plays primarily as a central defender, but has also been deployed as defensive midfielder or striker.

Personal life 
Mimbala who was born in Bonn, holds German passport, his parents immigrated from the DR Congo.

References

1986 births
Living people
Sportspeople from Bonn
German sportspeople of Democratic Republic of the Congo descent
Democratic Republic of the Congo footballers
German footballers
Footballers from North Rhine-Westphalia
Association football defenders
Democratic Republic of the Congo international footballers
3. Liga players
K.F.C. Dessel Sport players
SC Fortuna Köln players
FC Schalke 04 II players
Rot Weiss Ahlen players
SC Genemuiden players
SG Sonnenhof Großaspach players
FC 08 Homburg players
VfR Mannheim players
SVN Zweibrücken players
FC Energie Cottbus players
Democratic Republic of the Congo expatriate footballers
German expatriate footballers
Democratic Republic of the Congo expatriate sportspeople in the Netherlands
German expatriate sportspeople in the Netherlands
Expatriate footballers in the Netherlands
Democratic Republic of the Congo expatriate sportspeople in Belgium
German expatriate sportspeople in Belgium
Expatriate footballers in Belgium